The New Zealand National Party leadership election was held to determine the future leadership of the New Zealand National Party. The election was won by  MP Robert Muldoon.

Background 
Marshall's government had been defeated by Labour in the 1972 general election. There had been some caucus dissension in 1974, encouraged by Muldoon, about whether or not Marshall should lead the National Party into the next election, scheduled in 1975. The party executive asked the caucus to affirm that it supported Marshall continuing as leader. On 3 July 1974, the caucus voted 19 to 13 in favour of having a leadership vote. Believing he would probably lose a vote he sought the advice of MP George Gair who strongly urged him not to stand for re-election. Marshall announced his resignation as party leader the next day on 4 July 1974.

Candidates

Robert Muldoon 
Muldoon was a high-profile member of the National Party. He had served as Minister of Finance under Holyoake since 1967. It was he whose National's shock win in 1969 was attributed and as s result Muldoon had challenged Marshall for the leadership in 1972 but was defeated. Muldoon had become a popular figure with the public and adapted well to the new media of television coverage that other politicians struggled with which increased his campaigning abilities. In opposition, Marshall was shown to be ineffectual at the skills required to topple Labour's popular leader Norman Kirk and as a result National's backbenchers were increasingly looking to Muldoon for leadership raising questions of Marshall.

Result 
A leadership election was held on 9 July 1974 in which Muldoon was the only candidate and was acclaimed.

Aftermath 

Muldoon became Leader of the Opposition and went on to lead the National Party to victory in the 1975 general election, becoming Prime Minister of New Zealand and would remain in power until the 1984 election. Marshall retired at the 1975 election, serving as Muldoon's Shadow Minister on Overseas Trade until the dissolution of Parliament.

Notes

References

National Party leadership
1974
July 1974 events in New Zealand
New Zealand National Party leadership election